Vincenzo Moretti (14 November 1815 – 6 October 1881) was an Italian Roman Catholic cardinal and the Archbishop of Ravenna from 1871 until his resignation in 1879. He was elevated to the cardinalate in late 1877.

He served first as the Bishop of Comacchio (1855–60) and then as the Bishop of Cesena (1860-1867); he later served as the Bishop of Imola (1867–71) before being transferred to the Ravenna archbishopric.  He participated in the 1878 conclave that elected Pope Leo XIII.

References

Bibliography

1815 births
1881 deaths
19th-century Italian cardinals
Cardinals created by Pope Pius IX